Ol Ravy ( born 15 August 1993) is a former Cambodian footballer who lasted for the National Police Commissary in the Cambodian League and also Cambodia national football team.

International career
He made his first appearance for his home country in the friendly match against India on 22 March 2017.

References

Living people
Cambodia international footballers
1993 births
Cambodian footballers
Association football midfielders